En Tus Brazos is a 2006 French 3D computer-animated short film directed by Fx Goby, Matthieu Landour and Edouard Jouret. The film inspired by Tango culture has been shown in many festivals around the world and won a few awards including the SIGGRAPH Award of Excellence  in 2007. The film has also been shown in festivals such as Annecy International Animated Film Festival, and the Clermont-Ferrand International Short Film Festival.

En Tus Brazos is a graduation film from Supinfocom 2006.

Plot
The greatest tango dancer of the '20s is stuck in a wheelchair after an accident. Thanks to his wife, he recovers the use of his legs, the time of one imaginary dance.

Awards
"Award of Excellence", SIGGRAPH 2007

References

External links
 

2006 films
2006 short films
2006 computer-animated films
2000s French animated films
2006 3D films
2000s Spanish-language films
French 3D films
French animated short films
French computer-animated films
3D animated short films
2000s French films